Dato Sri Tiong King Sing JP (Bàng-uâ-cê: Diŏng Kéng-séng; born 3 September 1961) is a Malaysian politician who has served as Minister of Tourism, Arts and Culture in the Pakatan Harapan (PH) administration under Prime Minister Anwar Ibrahim since December 2022 and the Special Envoy of the Prime Ministers  Muhyiddin Yassin, Ismail Sabri Yaakob and Anwar to China since April 2020, Member of Parliament (MP) for Bintulu since November 1999 and Member of the Sarawak State Legislative Assembly (MLA) for Dudong since December 2021. He served as Special Envoy of the Prime Ministers Najib Razak and Mahathir Mohamad to East Asia from January 2014 to June 2018. He is a member of the Progressive Democratic Party (PDP), a component party of the Gabungan Parti Sarawak (GPS) and formerly Barisan Nasional (BN) coalition. He has served as President of PDP since November 2017. In accordance with its expansion to West Malaysia in November 2017, the party was rebranded with its new name and logo from the Sarawak Progressive Democratic Party (SPDP), a former component party of the BN coalition. He served as the 3rd Chairman of the BN Backbenchers Club from April 2008 to June 2013. He also served as President of SPDP from May 2014 to November 2017 and Deputy President of SPDP from March 2012 to his promotion to the SPDP presidency in May 2014 and previously the Treasurer-General of SPDP. Following the collapse of the BN administration after the 2018 general election and in the aftermath, a meeting between all Sarawak-based BN component parties was held on 12 June 2018, PDP decided to leave the coalition with the other three parties to form a new Sarawak-based political coalition in the meeting, namely the GPS coalition.

Political career
Tiong was originally a member of the Sarawak National Party (SNAP) but was dismissed in 2002 for what the party cited as disciplinary reasons. He subsequently joined the SPDP.

At the 2008 general election, he successfully defended his seat receiving 73% of the vote.

Tiong was re-elected to Parliament again in 2013 general election, and the following year became the President of the SPDP, replacing William Mawan Ikom, who had resigned from the party.

In 2018 general election, Tiong retained his seat in Bintulu with a majority of 7,022.

In 2022 general election, Tiong won his seat in Bintulu with overwhelming majority of 22,168. On 3 December 2022, Tiong is appointed by Prime Minister Anwar Ibrahim as the Minister of Tourism.

Issues raised

Gangsterism in Sarawak
In 2007 he became involved in a dispute with police administration alleging that criminal gangs were acting with impunity throughout Sarawak but that his concerns were not being addressed by police. His outspokenness was reported to have triggered a large police operation against criminal organisations in the State. Tiong subsequently received mail threats, including a parcel of shotgun cartridges, at his constituency office.

Pan Borneo Highway
In 2013, Tiong urged the repair of Pan-Borneo Highway because poor road conditions had cause fatal road traffic accidents on the highway. In 2016, he suggests that the highway project should include up-gradation of coastal road from Bintulu to Miri and double carriageway for easier travel on the road. In 2017, Tiong criticised that Pan Borneo Highway up-gradation project had bypassed Bintulu, thus not benefitting the local people of Bintulu. In 2018, Tiong criticised the highway contractors for lack of safety warning signs, potholes and damage to public utilities.

In June 2019,   complained again that the Pan Borneo Highway road conditions did not improve despite the road inspections done by Democratic Action Party (DAP), which at that time was part of the ruling Pakatan Harapan coalition. In December 2019, Tiong criticises works minister Baru Bian for slow response to Pan Borneo Highway issues. He also alleged that Work Package Contractors (WPCs) were paid despite not completing works up to standard. However, the Work Ministry said that the federal government had appointed  Lebuhraya Borneo Utara (LBU) to oversee the works done by WPCs. Payments to the WPCs will be done by LBU also. Meanwhile, the federal government had issued a termination letter on 20 September 2019 to LBU which would take effect on 20 February 2020.

COVID-19 pandemic
On 21 June 2020, as a result from Tiong's effort in raising funds from private sector and individuals, a polymerase chain reaction (PCR) lab was set up in Bintulu Hospital to conduct tests for COVID-19 without the need to send the samples to Sibu or Kuching for processing. In July 2020, he also complained the slow response of Malaysian Ministry of Health in supplying personal protective equipment (PPE) to Sarawak during the COVID-19 pandemic in the country. He also denounced the use of rapid RTK antigen tests for COVID-19 due to high false negatives rates amongst the patients screened. However, according to Malaysian Institute of Medical Research, the antigen RTK's sensitivity level stood at 90 per cent, while specificity remains at 100 per cent.

Controversies

Kong-Kali-Kong pet phrase
In 2015, Tiong King Sing introduced a pet phrase into Parliament when he described Opposition lawmakers as "Kong-Kali-Kong" MPs. Tiong made the remark after several opposition MPs lashed out at Barisan Nasional (BN) lawmakers, in particular Azalina Othman Said (Umno-Pengerang) for tabling a motion to suspend Lim Kit Siang (DAP-Gelang Patah). Among the opposition lawmakers who voiced their disagreement with the tabling of the motion were Gobind Singh Deo (DAP-Puchong), Ramkarpal Singh (DAP-Bukit Gelugor), Khalid Samad (Amanah-Shah Alam) and Tony Pua (DAP-Petaling Jaya Utara). In an attempt to silence them, Tiong used the term "Kong-Kali-Kong" on them, which he explained as "empty vessels" or "people with no insight on any matter whatsoever." This remark was followed by roars of laughter from other MPs who practically drowned out Gobind, who asked sarcastically, "What does that mean? Is that Bahasa Malaysia?" The pandemonium was triggered when Lim was suspended from Parliament for six months for refusing to apologise or retract his allegation that Pandikar Amin Mulia had abused his position as Dewan Rakyat Speaker on the Public Accounts Committee's (PAC) investigations on 1Malaysia Development Bhd (1MDB) when he ordered that it be temporarily suspended. Speaking up in defence of Pandikar, Tiong said the Speaker had to be firm in allowing the motion to be tabled by Azalina for voting. "Remember, we have to respect the Speaker," Tiong said, adding that he believed opposition MPs would never admit their faults and would instead continue to block the issue from being debated.

"Afraid to die" remark against Director-General of Health
On 11 November 2020, Tiong criticised Director-General (DG) of Health, Dr. Noor Hisham Abdullah that he did not visit Bintulu during the COVID-19 pandemic and alleged that the DG is "afraid to die". However Noor Hisham defended himself that he had visited Sabah in August 2020 for preparation works before Sabah State Election. He also sent his deputies to Sabah in November during Sabah COVID-19 pandemic. He also said that death does not discriminate anyone. Five days later, Tiong apologised for his remark.

Election results

Honours
  :
  Commander of the Order of Meritorious Service (PJN) – Datuk (2007)
  :
  Knight Companion of the Order of Sultan Salahuddin Abdul Aziz Shah (DSSA) – Dato’ (1996)
  Knight Grand Companion of the Order of Sultan Salahuddin Abdul Aziz Shah (SSSA) – Dato’ Seri (2000)
  :
  Grand Knight of the Order of Sultan Ahmad Shah of Pahang (SSAP) – Dato’ Sri (2006)
  :
  Knight Commander of the Order of the Crown of Kelantan (DPMK) – Dato' (2009)
  :
  Knight Commander of the Most Exalted Order of the Star of Sarawak (PNBS) – Dato Sri (2018)

See also
 Bintulu (federal constituency)

References

Living people
1961 births
Knights Commander of the Most Exalted Order of the Star of Sarawak
People from Sarawak
Malaysian politicians of Chinese descent
Commanders of the Order of Meritorious Service
Sarawak National Party politicians
Progressive Democratic Party (Malaysia) politicians
Members of the Dewan Rakyat
21st-century Malaysian politicians